The 10th Illinois Infantry Regiment was an infantry regiment that served in the Union Army between April 20, 1861, and July 11, 1865, during the American Civil War.

Service

Initial 3 month service
The infantry regiment was organized at Springfield, Illinois from the first companies reporting on April 20th, 1861. They were ordered to Cairo, Illinois on April 22nd where it became fully organized by an additional three companies, three artillery companies and mustered in for a three-month service by Captain John Pope, United States Army, on April 29th, 1861. They were attached to Prentiss' Brigade and placed on garrison duty at Cairo, Illinois until being mustered out on July 29th, 1861.

3 year service
The regiment saw service at the Battle of Island Number Ten, the Battle of Resaca, the Battle of Kennesaw Mountain, the March to the Sea and the Carolinas Campaign. The regiment was mustered out on July 4, 1865, and discharged at Chicago, Illinois, on July 11, 1865.

Total strength and casualties 
The regiment suffered 2 officers and 48 enlisted men killed in action or mortally wounded and 136 enlisted men who died of disease, for a total of 186 fatalities.

Commanders 
 Colonel James D. Morgan - promoted to brigadier general on July 17, 1862
 Colonel John Tillson - discharged with the regiment

See also

List of Illinois Civil War units
Illinois in the Civil War

References

Bibliography 
 Dyer, Frederick H. (1959). A Compendium of the War of the Rebellion. New York and London. Thomas Yoseloff, Publisher. .

External links 
The Civil War Archive

Units and formations of the Union Army from Illinois
1861 establishments in Illinois
Military units and formations established in 1861
Military units and formations disestablished in 1865